Time Machine is a series of children's novels published in the United States by Bantam Books from 1984 to 1989, similar to their more successful Choose Your Own Adventure line of "interactive" novels. Each book was written in the second person, with the reader choosing how the story should progress. They were designed by Byron Preiss Visual Publications. 

The main difference between the Choose Your Own Adventure series and the Time Machine series was that Time Machine books featured only one ending, forcing the reader to try many different choices until they discovered it. Also, the series taught children basic history about many diverse subjects, from dinosaurs to World War II. Only the sixth book in the series, The Rings of Saturn, departed from actual history; it is set in the future, and features educational content about the solar system. Some books gave the reader their choice from a small list of equipment at the beginning, and this choice would affect events later in the book (e.g. "If you brought the pen knife, turn to page 52, if not turn to page 45."). Another main difference between the Time Machine novels and the Choose Your Own Adventure counterparts was hints offered at certain junctures, where the reader was advised to look at hints at the back of the book. An example was in Mission to World War II about the Warsaw Ghetto uprising, where the reader was given the choice of starting the mission in the Jewish ghetto or the Aryan part of Warsaw, in which the hint read "Ringelblum was Jewish", suggesting the reader should begin in the Jewish section of the city, but not ordering it, or it was possible for the hint to be missed.

The line spawned a brief spin-off series for younger readers,  the Time Traveler novels.

Books

1984 
 1. Secret of the Knights by Jim Gasperini, 
 2. Search for Dinosaurs by David Bischoff, 
 3. Sword of the Samurai by Michael Reaves and Steve Perry, 
 4. Sail with Pirates by Jim Gasperini, 
 5. Civil War Secret Agent by Steve Perry,

1985
 6. The Rings of Saturn by Arthur Byron Cover, 
 7. Ice Age Explorer by Dougal Dixon, 
 8. The Mystery of Atlantis by Jim Gasperini, 
 9. Wild West Rider by Stephen Overholser, 
 10. American Revolutionary by Arthur Byron Cover,

1986
 11. Mission to World War II by Susan Nanus and Marc Kornblatt, 
 12. Search for the Nile by Robert W. Walker, 
 13. Secret of the Royal Treasure by Carol Gaskin, 
 14. Blade of the Guillotine by Arthur Byron Cover, 
 15. Flame of the Inquisition by Marc Kornblatt,

1987
 16. Quest for the Cities of Gold by Richard Glatzer, 
 17. Scotland Yard Detective by Seymour V. Reit, 
 18. Sword of Caesar by Robin Stevenson and Bruce Stevenson, 
 19. Death Mask of Pancho Villa by Carol Gaskin and George Guthridge, 
 20. Bound for Australia by Nancy Bailey, 
 21. Caravan to China by Carol Gaskin,

1988
 22. Last of the Dinosaurs by Peter Lerangis, 
 23. Quest for King Arthur by Ruth Ashby, 
 24. World War I Flying Ace by Richard Mueller,

1989
 25. Special Edition: World War II Code Breaker by Peter Lerangis,

See also 
 Gamebook

External links 
 Time Machine book list and reviews (gamebooks.org)

Footnotes

Gamebooks
Lists of fantasy books
Novel series
Novels about time travel
Children's historical novels
Bantam Books books